The 2020–21 season was the club's seventh season since its establishment in 2014, and their seventh season in the Indian Super League. In addition to the league, the club will also compete in the Indian Super Cup, and the AFC Champions League reaching till its group stages.

Players

Current squad

Transfers

Transfers in

Loan Returns

Loan outs

Transfers out

Current technical staff

Pre-season and friendlies

Competitions

Overview

Indian Super League

League table

Results by matchday

Matches

Playoffs

AFC Champions League

Group stage

Matches

Statistics

Squad appearances and goals

|-
! colspan=10 style=background:#dcdcdc; text-align:center| Goalkeepers

|-
! colspan=10 style=background:#dcdcdc; text-align:center| Defenders

 |-
! colspan=11 style=background:#dcdcdc; text-align:center| Midfielders

|-
! colspan=10 style=background:#dcdcdc; text-align:center| Forwards

|}

Goal scorers

Clean sheets

Notes

References

FC Goa seasons
FC Goa